Hercule is a 1938 French comedy film directed by Alexander Esway and starring Fernandel, Gaby Morlay and Pierre Brasseur. The film's sets were designed by Pierre Schild. Jean Grémillon was the film's original director, but he left shortly after production had begun. A simple fisherman from Provence inherits a Parisian newspaper, but finds some of his new staff are dishonest.

Main cast
 Fernandel as Hercule Maffre  
 Gaby Morlay as Juliette Leclerc  
 Pierre Brasseur as Bastien  
 Henri Crémieux as Bajoux  
 Édouard Delmont as Maffre  
 Nane Germon as Miette  
 Vincent Hyspa as Cahuzac  
 Robert Pizani as Le premier frère Riquel  
 Henri Poupon as Boeuf  
 Jean Tissier as Le troisième frère Riquel  
 Charles Dechamps as Le second frère Riquel  
 Jules Berry as Vasco

References

Bibliography 
Oscherwitz, Dayna & Higgins, Maryellen. The A to Z of French Cinema. Scarecrow Press, 2009.

External links 
 

1938 films
French comedy films
1938 comedy films
1930s French-language films
Films directed by Alexander Esway
Films set in Paris
French black-and-white films
1930s French films